Betty Boop with Henry, the Funniest Living American is a 1935 Fleischer Studios animated short film starring Betty Boop, and featuring Carl Anderson's Henry. The short was also released as Betty Boop with Henry.

Plot
Betty runs the local pet store.  Silent Henry wants to buy a puppy, but only has two cents.  Soft-hearted Betty offers to let Henry work off the difference at her store.  She soon regrets this decision after Henry causes a ruckus trying to manage the pets.  In the end, Henry recaptures some escaped birds (by letting them eat seeds off his head), and Betty rewards him with the puppy he wanted.

Notes and comments
The Henry comic strip debuted in 1932, and still runs in some papers.  This short was Henry's sole animated appearance.

Betty sings "Everybody Ought to Have a Pet."

See also
 Betty Boop and the Little King

References

External links
 Henry, The Funniest Living American on YouTube.
 

1935 short films
Animated crossover films
Betty Boop cartoons
Animated films based on comics
Films based on American comics
1930s American animated films
American black-and-white films
1935 animated films
Paramount Pictures short films
Fleischer Studios short films
Short films directed by Dave Fleischer
1930s English-language films
American comedy short films
American animated short films
Animated films about children
Animated films about animals
Films about pets